The infraorbital groove (or sulcus) is located in the middle of the posterior part of the orbital surface of the maxilla. Its function is to act as the passage of the infraorbital artery, the infraorbital vein, and the infraorbital nerve.

Structure 
The infraorbital groove begins at the middle of the posterior border of the maxilla (with which it is continuous). This is near the upper edge of the infratemporal surface of the maxilla. It passes forward, and ends in a canal which subdivides into two branches.

The infraorbital groove has an average length of 16.7 mm, with a small amount of variation between people. It is similar in men and women.

Function 
The infraorbital groove creates space that allows for passage of the infraorbital artery, the infraorbital vein, and the infraorbital nerve.

Clinical significance 
The infraorbital groove is an important surgical landmark for local anaesthesia of the infraorbital nerve.

See also 
 Infraorbital foramen

Additional images

References

External links 
 

Bones of the head and neck